Metabetaeus is a genus of shrimp in the family Alpheidae, comprising three species:
Metabetaeus lohena Banner & Banner, 1960
Metabetaeus mcphersonae Anker, 2010
Metabetaeus minutus (Whitelegge, 1897)

References

Alpheidae
Decapod genera